Diyawanna Lake or Parliament Lake, is one of the lakes within Sri Jayawardenepura Kotte, Sri Lanka.

It is quite popular as the Sri Lankan Parliament Building was built on an artificial island at the centre of the lake. The Diyatha Uyana park is also located on the banks of this lake. This lake was created in 1979 and has eight islands.

See also 

 Geography of Sri Lanka

References 

Sri Jayawardenepura Kotte
Reservoirs in Sri Lanka
Bodies of water of Colombo District
Lakes of Sri Lanka